Southern Rivers is an area in southwest Georgia, United States, spreading north.

Geography
The Southern Rivers Region constitutes the southwest corner of the state of Georgia and is made up of the following counties:

Baker
Berrien
Brooks
Chattahoochee
Clay
Colquitt
Cook
Coweta
Crisp
Decatur
Dooly
Dougherty
Early
Echols
Fayette
Grady
Harris
Heard
Irwin
Lanier
Lee
Lowndes
Macon
Meriwether
Miller
Muscogee
Pike
Quitman
Randolph
Schley
Seminole
Spalding
Stewart
Sumter
Talbot
Taylor
Terrell
Thomas
Tift
Troup
Turner
Upson
Worth

Regions of Georgia (U.S. state)